DNS over HTTPS (DoH) is a protocol for performing remote Domain Name System (DNS) resolution via the HTTPS protocol. A goal of the method is to increase user privacy and security by preventing eavesdropping and manipulation of DNS data by man-in-the-middle attacks by using the HTTPS protocol to encrypt the data between the DoH client and the DoH-based DNS resolver.  By March 2018,  Google and the Mozilla Foundation had started testing versions of DNS over HTTPS. In February 2020, Firefox switched to DNS over HTTPS by default for users in the United States.

An alternative to DoH is the DNS over TLS (DoT) protocol, a similar standard for encrypting DNS queries, differing only in the methods used for encryption and delivery. Based on privacy and security, whether which protocol is superior is a matter of controversial debate; while others argue the merits of either depend on the specific use case.

Technical details 
DoH is a proposed standard, published as RFC 8484 (October 2018) by the IETF. It uses HTTP/2 and HTTPS, and supports the wire format DNS response data, as returned in existing UDP responses, in an HTTPS payload with the MIME type application/dns-message. If HTTP/2 is used, the server may also use HTTP/2 server push to send values that it anticipates the client may find useful in advance.

DoH is a work in progress. Even though the IETF has published RFC 8484 as a proposed standard and companies are experimenting with it, the IETF has yet to determine how it should best be implemented. The IETF is evaluating a number of approaches for how best to deploy DoH and is looking to set up a working group, Adaptive DNS Discovery (ADD), to do this work and develop a consensus. In addition, other industry working groups such as the Encrypted DNS Deployment Initiative, have been formed to "define and adopt DNS encryption technologies in a manner that ensures the continued high performance, resiliency, stability and security of the Internet's critical namespace and name resolution services, as well as ensuring the continued unimpaired functionality of security protections, parental controls, and other services that depend upon the DNS".

Since DoH cannot be used under some circumstances, like captive portals, web browsers like Firefox can be configured to fallback to insecure DNS.

Oblivious DNS-over-HTTPS 

Oblivious DoH is an Internet Draft proposing a protocol extension to ensure no single DoH server is aware of both the client's IP address and their message contents. Oblivious DoH was originally developed as Oblivious DNS (ODNS) by researchers at Princeton University and the University of Chicago as an extension to unencrypted DNS, before DoH itself was standardized and widely deployed. Apple and Cloudflare subsequently deployed the technology in the context of DoH, as Oblivious DoH (ODoH).

In ODoH and ODNS, all DNS requests and responses routed via a proxy, hiding clients' addresses from the resolver. Requests are encrypted to hide their contents from the proxy, and only the resolver can decrypt the request. Thus, the proxy knows the client address but not the request, and the resolver knows the request but not the client address, preventing the two client address being linked to the query, unless both servers collude.

Deployment scenarios 
DoH is used for recursive DNS resolution by DNS resolvers. Resolvers (DoH clients) must have access to a DoH server hosting a query endpoint.

Three usage scenarios are common:

 Using a DoH implementation within an application: Some browsers have a built-in DoH implementation and can thus perform queries by bypassing the operating system's DNS functionality. A drawback is that an application may not inform the user if it skips DoH querying, either by misconfiguration or lack of support for DoH.
 Installing a DoH proxy on the name server in the local network: In this scenario client systems continue to use traditional (port 53 or 853) DNS to query the name server in the local network, which will then gather the necessary replies via DoH by reaching DoH-servers in the Internet. This method is transparent to the end user.
 Installing a DoH proxy on a local system: In this scenario, operating systems are configured to query a locally running DoH proxy. In contrast to the previously mentioned method, the proxy needs to be installed on each system wishing to use DoH, which might require a lot of effort in larger environments.

Software support

Operating systems

Apple 
Apple's iOS 14 and macOS 11 released in late 2020 support both DoH and DoT protocols.

Windows 
In November 2019, Microsoft announced plans to implement support for encrypted DNS protocols in Microsoft Windows, beginning with DoH. In May 2020, Microsoft released Windows 10 Insider Preview Build 19628 that included initial support for DoH along with instructions on how to enable it via registry and command line interface. Windows 10 Insider Preview Build 20185 added graphical user interface for specifying a DoH resolver. DoH support is not included in Windows 10 21H2.

Windows 11 has DoH support.

Recursive DNS resolvers

BIND 

BIND 9, an open source DNS resolver from Internet Systems Consortium added native support for DoH in version 9.17.10.

PowerDNS 

DNSdist, an open source DNS proxy/load balancer from PowerDNS, added native support for DoH in version 1.4.0 in April 2019.

Unbound 

Unbound, an open source DNS resolver created by NLnet Labs, has supported DoH since version 1.12.0, released in October 2020. It first implemented support for DNS encryption using the alternative DoT protocol much earlier, starting with version 1.4.14, released in December 2011. Unbound runs on most operating systems, including distributions of Linux, MacOS, and Windows.

Web browsers

Google Chrome 
DNS over HTTPS is available in Google Chrome 83 or later for Windows, Linux, and macOS, configurable via the settings page. When enabled, and the operating system is configured with a supported DNS server, Chrome will upgrade DNS queries to be encrypted. It is also possible to manually specify a preset or custom DoH server to use within the user interface.

In September 2020, Google Chrome for Android began staged rollout of DNS over HTTPS. Users can configure a custom resolver or disable DNS over HTTPS in settings.

Google Chrome has 5 DNS over HTTPS providers pre-configured which are Google Public DNS, Cloudflare 1.1.1.1, Quad 9.9.9.9, NextDNS, and CleanBrowsing.

Microsoft Edge 
Microsoft Edge supports DNS over HTTPS, configurable via the settings page. When enabled, and the operating system is configured with a supported DNS server, Edge will upgrade DNS queries to be encrypted. It is also possible to manually specify a preset or custom DoH server to use within the user interface.

Mozilla Firefox 

In 2018, Mozilla partnered with Cloudflare to deliver DoH for Firefox users that enable it (known as Trusted Recursive Resolver). On February 25, 2020, Firefox started enabling DNS over HTTPS for all US-based users, relying on Cloudflare's resolver by default.

Opera 
Opera supports DoH, configurable via the browser settings page. By default, DNS queries are sent to Cloudflare servers.

Public DNS servers 

DNS over HTTPS server implementations are already available free of charge by some public DNS providers.

Implementation considerations 

Many issues with how to properly deploy DoH are still being resolved by the internet community including, but not limited to:

 Stopping third-parties from analyzing DNS traffic for security purposes 
 Disruption of DNS-level parental controls and content filters
 Split DNS in enterprise networks
 CDN localization

Analysis of DNS traffic for security purposes 
DoH can impede analysis and monitoring of DNS traffic for cybersecurity purposes; the 2019 DDoS worm Godlua used DoH to mask connections to its command-and-control server.

In January 2021, NSA warned enterprises against using external DoH resolvers because they prevent DNS query filtering, inspection, and audit. Instead, NSA recommends configuring enterprise-owned DoH resolvers and blocking all known external DoH resolvers.

Disruption of content filters 

DoH has been used to bypass parental controls which operate at the (unencrypted) standard DNS level; Circle, a parental control router which relies on DNS queries to check domains against a blocklist, blocks DoH by default due to this. However, there are DNS providers that offer filtering and parental controls along with support for DoH by operating DoH servers.

The Internet Service Providers Association (ISPA)—a trade association representing British ISPs—and the also British body Internet Watch Foundation have criticized Mozilla, developer of the Firefox web browser, for supporting DoH, as they believe that it will undermine web blocking programs in the country, including ISP default filtering of adult content, and mandatory court-ordered filtering of copyright violations. The ISPA nominated Mozilla for its "Internet Villain" award for 2019 (alongside the EU Directive on Copyright in the Digital Single Market, and Donald Trump), "for their proposed approach to introduce DNS-over-HTTPS in such a way as to bypass UK filtering obligations and parental controls, undermining internet safety standards in the UK." Mozilla responded to the allegations by the ISPA, arguing that it would not prevent filtering, and that they were "surprised and disappointed that an industry association for ISPs decided to misrepresent an improvement to decades-old internet infrastructure". In response to the criticism, the ISPA apologized and withdrew the nomination. Mozilla subsequently stated that DoH will not be used by default in the British market until further discussion with relevant stakeholders, but stated that it "would offer real security benefits to UK citizens".

See also 
 DNS over TLS
 DNSCrypt
 DNSCurve
 EDNS Client Subnet

References

External links 
 DNS Privacy Project: dnsprivacy.org
 DNS over HTTPS Implementations
 A cartoon intro to DNS over HTTPS
 DNS over HTTPS  (DoH) Considerations for Operator Networks] (draft, expired on 12 March 2020)
 Privacy Tools - Encrypted DNS Resolver
Application layer protocols
Web security exploits
Domain Name System
Internet protocols